Vasilopita (Vasilópita, lit. '(St.) Basil-pie' or 'Vassilis pie', see below) is a New Year's Day bread, cake or pie in Greece and many other areas in eastern Europe and the Balkans which contains a hidden coin or trinket which gives good luck to the receiver, like the Western European King Cake. It is associated with Saint Basil's day, January 1, in most of Greece, but in some regions, the traditions surrounding a cake or pita with a hidden coin are attached to Epiphany or to Christmas. It is made of a variety of dough, depending on regional and family tradition, including tsoureki. In some families, instead of dough, it is made from a custard base called galatopita (literally milk-pita). In the Thessaly region a pork filled phyllo pie is made with a hidden coin. The pie is also known as Chronópita (Χρονόπιτα < χρόνος: chrónos ⇨ time/year + πίτα: píta ⇨ pie), meaning "New Year's pie". 

In other areas of the Balkans, the tradition of cake with a hidden coin during winter holidays exists, but is not associated with Saint Basil at all. The practice is documented among Ukrainians (a pirog is cut); Romanians; Serbs ("česnica", eaten on Christmas); Albanians ("pitta", eaten by both Christians and Muslims); Bulgarians (pogacha, Novogodishna banitsa (for New Year's), Svety Vasileva pogacha); etc.

Ritual
On New Year's Day families cut the vasilopita to bless the house and bring good luck for the new year. This is usually done at the midnight of New Year's Eve. A coin is hidden in the bread by slipping it into the dough before baking. At midnight the sign of the cross is etched with a knife across the cake. A piece of cake is sliced for each member of the family and any visitors present at the time, by order of age from eldest to youngest. Slices are also cut for various symbolic people or groups, depending on local and family tradition. They may include the Lord, St. Basil and other saints, the poor, the household, or the Kallikantzaroi. In older times, the coin often was a valuable one, such as a gold sovereign. Nowadays there is often a prearranged gift, money, or otherwise, to be given to the coin recipient.

Many private or public institutions, such as societies, clubs, workplaces, companies, etc., cut their vasilopita at a convenient time between New Year's Day and the beginning of the Great Fast, in celebrations that range from impromptu potluck gatherings to formal receptions or balls.

Saint Basil's Feast Day is observed on January 1, the beginning of the New Year and the Epiphany season known as the Vasilopita Observance.

Origins

Hasluck (1927) connects both the western and the eastern celebrations to the ancient Greek Kronia, the festival of Cronus, which involved selecting a "king" by lot, and then the Roman Saturnalia. The traditions surrounding vasilopita are very similar to western European celebrations of the Twelfth Night and Epiphany: the king cake of France and Louisiana and the tortell in Catalonia.

Nonetheless, in popular tradition, vasilopita is associated with a legend of Basil of Caesarea. According to one story, Basil called on the Roman citizens of Caesarea to raise a ransom payment to stop the siege of the city. Each member of the city gave whatever they had in gold and jewelry. When the ransom was raised, the enemy was so embarrassed by the act of collective giving that he called off the siege without collecting payment. Basil was then tasked with returning the unpaid ransom, but had no way to know which items belonged to which family so he baked all of the jewellery into loaves of bread and distributed the loaves to the city, and by a miracle each citizen received their exact share. In some tellings, the sieging tribal chief is replaced with an evil emperor levying a tax or simply with Basil attempting to give charity to the poor without embarrassing them.

Bulgaria

In Bulgarian cuisine, pita or pitka is served on special occasions. It is a round bread loaf, which can sometimes be flavoured. Its preparation and consumption can have a ritual meaning. For example, on the night before Christmas Eve, ( - Badni vecher) each housewife prepares a pita and decorates it with symbols to bring fertility to the cattle and a rich harvest from the fields, as well as prosperity to each member of the household. She hides a coin in it. Whoever finds the coin will be the healthiest and the wealthiest of the family. Prior to marriage, a bride's future mother-in-law prepares a pita for the newlyweds and sifts the flour seven times, so that the pita will be soft as their future life together. Pita is also prepared for guests. A traditional welcome in Bulgaria includes pita and honey or salt. The meaning of this ritual can be found in the expression "to welcome someone with bread and salt" (since bread is an important part of Bulgarian cuisine - and as a Bulgarian proverb says, "no one is bigger than bread", and the salt is the basic ingredient that gives flavour to every meal).

Name

The name "βασιλόπιτα" comes from βασιλεύς 'king' + πίτα 'cake', but was reinterpreted as "Basil's (Βασίλειος) cake". In Cyprus it is also known as vasilopoulla ("βασιλοπούλλα").

See also
 King cake

References

Greek desserts
New Year foods
New Year celebrations
Christian folklore
Winter traditions
Kallikantzaros